A prakhom band is a type of traditional Thai music band employed to play ceremonial music–known as prakhom music–during certain Thai rituals. Today, they report to the Bureau of the Royal Household's (BRH) Royal Ceremonial Division, and are responsible for the playing of traditional songs during royal events of the Royal Family of Thailand, in a custom known as prakhom yam yam or royal ceremonial music performances. The Prakhom Band plays the prakhom part of state events involving the Thai Royal Family and are distinguished by their red dress uniforms and pith helmets. As the term states they play ceremonial music every three hours during state funeral rites to signal officials and staff members of the Royal Family and the ensemble plays in other events like state coronations, royal anniversaries and the State Opening of the National Assembly.

The ensemble is similar to the daechwita ensembles of South Korea, but are of Chinese and Hindu origin. Unlike other ensembles it reports as part of the Royal Ceremonial Division of the BRH, since the instruments are part of the Thai royal regalia. Of the 80 members, 38 work for the BRH, 42 are uniformed personnel of the Royal Thai Army 11th Military District (1st Division, King's Guard).

In parades and ceremonies these are reinforced by cadets of the Armed Forces Academies Preparatory School and traditional musicians from the Royal Thai Navy.

Instruments of the ensemble 

 If performing during state ceremonies:
 1 Royal Khong meng (the Victory Gong)
 1 Poeng mang
 2 Glong banthoh (gold small barrel drums, only for the King)
 16 Klong khaek
 2 Pi chanai
 8–12 Trae horns (small horns)
 2–4 Sangkhlas (conch shell horns)
 10–14 fanfare trumpets

 If on parade or during funeral marches:
 1 clapper (separate from the band)
 2 standard bearers
 2 Pi chanai
 1–2 poeng mang
 4 glong banthoh (only if the King is present) composed of 4 timpanists and a squad of 4 bearers on each drum
 160 1st Klong khaek
 40 2nd klong khaek (20 silver and 20 gold each)
 28 Trae horns
 4 Sangkla conch horns
 20 fanfare trumpets
 4 drum majors
 2 fanfare conductors

See also 
 Monarchy of Thailand
 Bureau of the Royal Household
 Traditional Thai musical instruments

References 

Marching bands
Thai music
Military music
Thai monarchy